Sitia Airport  is a small community airport in the region Mponta of Sitia Municipality, on the eastern part of Crete in Greece. The facility is serving the city of Sitia. The airport is located 1 km north/northwest of the city center.

History
Sitia Airport began operations on 7 June 1984 when the first aircraft landed on the facility. This was an Olympic Airways' Dornier Do-228, registration SX-BHF. This was a test flight, to test the airport and its handling facilities. The airport was officially opened 2 days later, on 9 June 1984. Its official name became Δημοτικός Αερολιμένας Σητείας, literally Municipal Airport of Sitia. At 10:30 the same day, the first official flight, OAL 7001, arrived. On 13 June, the first flight from Rhodes arrived, followed by a flight from the neighbouring island Karpathos the next day.

On 20 May 1993, the airport's services moved to a newly built terminal building and control tower. The new installations cover an area of 550 m2. A new runway, oriented 05/23 and with a length of 2,074 meters was completed in May 2003. Also, 3 new taxiways and 2 new aircraft stands have been constructed. Additionally, the old terminal building has been replaced by a temporary building, covering an area of 1,000 m2. On 13 January 13, 2016, the airport's services moved to a new terminal building. The new building has an area of 7,500 m2.

Airlines and destinations
The following airlines operate regular scheduled and charter flights at Sitia Airport:

Statistics

Annual Passenger Throughput

 Period: Jan - Jun

Ground transportation
By car the airport can be reached via the main road along the North coast. From Aghios Nikolaos, heading west, the main road transforms into the National Road of Crete. The City of Sitia is just a few minutes drive away from the airport. Besides rental cars, there are taxis available to any destination on Crete. There are no bus connections available from the airport.

See also
List of airports in Crete
Transport in Greece

References

External links
 HCAA Website
 airport information at greek-airports.gr

Airports in Greece
Buildings and structures in Lasithi
Airports in Crete